Curtis Warren Kamman (born January 15, 1939) is an American former career diplomat.

Kamman graduated from Tucson High School and Yale University and entered the United States Foreign Service in 1960. He served as United States Ambassador to Bolivia, Chile, and Colombia. Kamman also served in various positions in the United States Department of State, including Director of East African Affairs, and in diplomatic assignments in Mexico, Hong Kong, Kenya, Cuba and the Soviet Union. In 1991, he was sent by President George H. W. Bush to re-establish diplomatic relations with the newly independent nations of Latvia, Lithuania and Estonia.

Kamman retired from the Foreign Service in 2000. After his retirement, Kamman taught diplomacy and U.S. foreign policy at the University of Notre Dame. He is a member of  the American Academy of Diplomacy.

Curtis Kamman married the former Mary Glasgow Curtis, and they have three sons.

References

External links
 

1939 births
Living people
People from Chicago
Ambassadors of the United States to Colombia
Ambassadors of the United States to Chile
Ambassadors of the United States to Bolivia
Tucson High School alumni
United States Foreign Service personnel